Michelle Ross-Cope (born 31 January 1972) is an English long-distance runner. She competed for Britain at the European Athletics Championships and several IAAF World Half Marathon Championships. She also represented England at the 2010 Commonwealth Games. She has also won several British domestic road races.

Ross-Cope began running competitive half marathon races in 2006. By 2007 she was representing Britain in the IAAF World Road Running Championships 
which she did for three successive years. The third of these was the most successful as she finished 33rd and the British women's team, of Ross-Cope with Claire Hallissey and Gemma Miles finished in 7th place despite the absence of Paula Radcliffe.

In 2009 a 2:36:02 finish in the London Marathon was just outside the required 2:34:00 qualifying time for 2009 World Championships in Athletics. However her best year was yet to come, and in 2010 she was selected  for the European Athletics Championships and finished 12th, the first Briton ahead of compatriot Susan Partridge. Then at the 2010 Commonwealth Games she finished in 6th position, again the first Briton ahead of Helen Decker and Holly Rush.

Competition Record

References

External links 
 Personal website
 
 
 

1972 births
Living people
British female long-distance runners
English female long-distance runners
British female marathon runners
English female marathon runners
Commonwealth Games competitors for England
Athletes (track and field) at the 2010 Commonwealth Games